Saint Melangell was an Irish nun who died in 590. Her feast day is celebrated on 27 May. The daughter of an Irish king, she went to Powys in central Wales to become a hermit. The prince of Powys, Brochwel Ysgithrog, granted her land after meeting her on a hunting trip, and she founded a community of women, serving as abbess for 37 years. Her shrine remains at St Melangell's Church, Pennant Melangell.

Legend
The Welsh antiquarian Thomas Pennant (1726–1798) related the story of Melangell.

Shrine at St Melangell's Church

Brochwel Ysgithrog, Prince of Powys awarded the valley near Saint Melangell's Church, Pennant Melangell to Melangell as a place of sanctuary, where she became abbess of a small religious community. After her death her memory continued to be honoured at her shrine, and Pennant Melangell has been a place of pilgrimage for many centuries. Melangell remains the patron saint of hares. Bones said to be those of the saint have been deposited within the shrine.

References

 St Melangell's Church & The Saint Melangell Centre
 St Melangell's Orthodox Church
 Archaeologia Cambrensis, The Journal of the Cambrian Archaeological Association, Vol. III, Sixth Series, London, 1903.
 Pennant Melangell
 Clwyd-Powys Archaeological Trust

Further reading
 Nancy Edwards, "Celtic Saints and Early Medieval Archaeology," in Local saints and local churches in the early medieval West (Oxford University Press, 2002), pp. 234ff. online.

6th-century Welsh people
Christian female saints of the Middle Ages
History of Powys
Medieval Welsh saints
590 deaths